Craven Arms railway station serves the town of Craven Arms in Shropshire, England. Until 1974 it was known as "Craven Arms and Stokesay", named after the nearby coaching inn (the town having not come into being prior to the arrival of the railways) and the historic settlement of Stokesay to the south. All passenger trains calling at the station are operated by Transport for Wales, who also manage it.

The station has two platforms, connected by a footbridge. Platform 1, on the west side, serves northbound trains to Shrewsbury and beyond as well as trains from Swansea via the Heart of Wales Line. Platform 2, on the town side of the station, serves southbound trains to Hereford and Cardiff and also southbound HoW services since signalling and track alterations in October 2018.

Between 1865 and 1935, Craven Arms was the junction terminus of the Bishops Castle Railway.  There was also a junction serving the line that went to Wellington via Much Wenlock. Adjacent to the station once stood the now demolished carriage sheds. There continues to be a signal box at Craven Arms, to the north of the station by the level crossing.

History

The Shrewsbury and Hereford Railway company was the first to serve the town, arriving from the north in 1852 and completing its route through to Hereford the following year. The Knighton Railway constructed the first of the three branches from the main line between 1858 and 1861. The second branch was that of the Bishops Castle Railway which arrived in 1865 via a junction with the main line about 1 km to the north, whilst the route from Much Wenlock was completed by the Wenlock, Craven Arms and Lightmoor Extension railway in 1867 (joining the main line a few miles north of the town at Marsh Farm Junction). The LNWR and Great Western Railway jointly leased the main line in 1862, whilst the modest Knighton branch would eventually be extended right through to Swansea by the LNWR over the course of the next decade. The Bishops Castle branch, which spent its entire existence in receivership closed in 1935. The Much Wenlock line by contrast would remain little altered throughout its life, although the GWR did take control of it soon after opening; its passenger trains ceased in 1951.  The station's locomotive shed closed in 1964 and goods traffic ceased in May 1968.

Facilities
The station is unstaffed and now has no permanent buildings other than standard metal and plexiglass waiting shelters on each platform (the main buildings on each side having been demolished by 1972).  A self-service ticket machine is however provided for intending passengers - this can also be used for collecting pre-paid tickets.  Train running information is offered via CIS displays, timetable posters and a customer help point on each platform.  A footbridge links both platforms, but step-free also offered on each side - this does though require a sizeable detour via local roads if changing platforms.

Services

Mondays to Saturdays trains from Carmarthen to Manchester Piccadilly (via Cardiff Central, Hereford, Shrewsbury, and Crewe) call at the station every two hours in both directions.  Most  to Cardiff trains also call here (also every two hours). On Sundays the frequency is irregular and there are no departures until just before noon.

References

Body, G. (1983), PSL Field Guides - Railways of the Western Region, Patrick Stephens Ltd, Wellingborough,

Further reading

External links

Railway stations in Shropshire
DfT Category F1 stations
Former Shrewsbury and Hereford Railway stations
Railway stations in Great Britain opened in 1852
Railway stations served by Transport for Wales Rail
Heart of Wales Line
1852 establishments in England
Craven Arms